Sebastiania crenulata is a species of plant in the family Euphorbiaceae. It is endemic to Jamaica.  It is threatened by habitat loss.

References

crenulata
Flora of Jamaica
Critically endangered plants
Endemic flora of Jamaica
Taxonomy articles created by Polbot
Taxobox binomials not recognized by IUCN